WNTD (950 AM) is a radio station licensed to Chicago, Illinois. It is owned by Relevant Radio, Inc. Its has separate day-time (1,000 watts; non-directional) and night-time (5,000 watts; directional) transmitter locations. It is currently one of three stations in the Chicago market that airs Relevant Radio, a Catholic talk format, 24 hours a day.

History

WAAF
The station was licensed by the Department of Commerce on April 7, 1922. It was one of the first radio stations licensed. It was owned by the Chicago Daily Drover's Journal, with its transmitter and studios at the Union Stock Yards. Its original call letters were WAAF. The station originally broadcast at 620 and 830 kHz. By 1923, the station's frequency had been changed to 1050 kHz. By 1925 the station was broadcasting at 1080 kHz, running 200 watts. By 1927, the station's power had been increased to 500 watts, and the station's frequency was changed to 770 kHz. In 1928, the station's frequency was changed to 920 kHz. The station operated during daytime hours only.

The station's programming was initially devoted to trade news, but in 1929, its programming was broadened. The station would air a variety of music programs, along with news, live market reports, and a variety of other programs.

The station's transmitter and studios were destroyed in the 1934 Stock Yards fire. The station broadcast live coverage of the fire until smoke and heat forced them to leave the building. The station's studios were moved to the Palmer House following the fire.

In 1936, the station's power was increased to 1,000 watts. In 1941, the station's frequency was changed to 950 kHz. In the 1940s, the station aired orchestral music and popular music. In 1948, the station's studios were moved to the LaSalle-Wacker Building.

In 1955, the station began airing "Juke Box Matinee", hosted by Hal Fredericks, in association with the Recorded Music Service Association and the Chicago Juke Box Operators' Association. The show featured a monthly "Hunch Tune", which would be promoted on the show and featured as the No. 1 selection in juke boxes. The first "Hunch Tune" was "Rollin' Stone" by Eddie Fontaine.

In 1956, the station adopted a jazz format. Personalities heard on the station during its jazz years included Marty Faye, Daddy-O Daylie, Olympic gold medalist Jesse Owens, and Dick Buckley.

WGRT

In 1967, the station was sold to a corporation formed by Ralph Atlass, for $900,000. The station's call sign was changed to WGRT ("W-Great!") and it adopted a soul music format. Daddy-O Daylie continued as a DJ on WGRT, hosting a morning jazz program. Daylie's jazz program was initially two hours long, but was reduced to an hour and a half, and eventually a half hour in 1971. In 1971, the station's transmitter was moved to the Midland Warehouses on Western Avenue in Chicago.

WJPC
On May 29, 1973, the station was purchased by Johnson Publishing Company for $1,800,000. On November 1, 1973, the station's call sign was changed to WJPC. The station aired an urban contemporary format. Disc jockeys included Tom Joyner and LaDonna Tittle. Daddy-O Daylie hosted a Sunday jazz program. In 1980, the station began nighttime operations, running 5,000 watts using a directional array. In the late 1980s and early 90s the station simulcast the soft urban contemporary format of its sister station 106.3 WLNR in Lansing, Illinois, and was branded "Soft Touch". At Noon on July 15, 1992, the station began airing an all-rap format.

106 Jamz
In 1994, Johnson Publishing sold the station, along with 106.3 WJPC-FM, to Broadcasting Partners for $8 million. In June 1994, the station became "106 Jamz", airing an urban contemporary format as a simulcast of 106.3 WJPC-FM. The station's call sign was changed to WEJM later that year, with its FM simulcast partner taking the call sign WEJM-FM. In spring of 1997, the station was sold to Douglas Broadcasting for $7.5 million. In June 1997, its FM sister station left the simulcast, adopting an urban gospel format as 106.3 WYBA.

One-on-One Sports
On August 28, 1997, WEJM 950's format was changed to sports, as a One-on-One Sports affiliate. Around this time, the station was purchased by One-on-One for $10 million. In November 1997, the station's call sign was changed to WIDB. One-On-One was headquartered in suburban Northbrook. The One-on-One Sports affiliation moved to WJKL on March 1, 1999, though the One-on-One Sports format continued to simulcast on WIDB until May 1999.

WNTD
In 1999, the station was sold to Radio Unica for $16,750,000. In May 1999, the station began airing a Spanish-language news-talk format as Radio Unica. The station's callsign was changed to WNTD that month. Personalities heard on Radio Unica included Paul Bouche and Dra. Isabel, among others. Ricardo Brown was news director. In 2004, Multicultural Radio Broadcasting acquired Radio Unica's 15 radio stations for $150 million.

WNTD was the original affiliate of Air America Radio in Chicago. Program hosts included Al Franken, Randi Rhodes, Janeane Garofalo, Rachel Maddow, Lizz Winstead and Chuck D.  The network launched on March 31, 2004. However, these programs ended after two weeks, on April 14, due to a payment dispute between Multicultural Radio Broadcasting, then owner of WNTD, and Air America Radio. On April 15, a judge ruled that Air America had fully paid for airtime on WNTD and ordered Multicultural to broadcast Air America on the station. However, Air America would only continue on the station through the end of the month. WNTD would return to airing a Spanish language format.

In 2007, the station was sold to Sovereign City Radio for $15 million. In October 2007, Relevant Radio began to air from 6 AM to 6 PM weekdays, while brokered Spanish language programming aired the remainder of the time.

From August 2009, until August 14, 2010, WNTD carried "Avenue 950", programmed by Sovereign City Radio Services, which featured an eclectic mix of jazz, blues, standards, and adult contemporary from 6:00 PM to 5:00 AM. Relevant Radio continued to air during the remainder of the station's schedule. On August 15, 2010, the station began airing Relevant Radio full time.

In 2014, the station was sold to Starboard Media Foundation, Inc. for $14.4 million. The transaction was consummated on May 2, 2014.

References

External links

NTD
Radio stations established in 1922
1922 establishments in Illinois
Catholic radio stations
Relevant Radio stations
NTD
Radio stations licensed before 1923 and still broadcasting